Capels is an unincorporated community on the Tug Fork River in McDowell County, West Virginia, United States.

Capels most likely was named after the local Capel family.

References 

Unincorporated communities in McDowell County, West Virginia
Unincorporated communities in West Virginia
Coal towns in West Virginia